Pavel Petrovich Maksutov ( April 25, 1825 – May 2, 1882) was an Imperial Russian Navy rear-admiral, prince, hero of Crimean War, 15th governor of Taganrog.

Pavel Maksutov was born in Penza into a Russian noble family of Pyotr Ivanovich Maksutov. His brothers and sisters were: Nikolay, Alexander (lieutenant, heavily wounded on August 24, 1854 during the siege of Petropavlovsk-Kamchatsky, died on September 10 of the same year), Yekaterina, Dmitri (rear-admiral, the last governor of Alaska), Pyotr and Georgy. 

He entered the Naval Cadet Corps in Saint Petersburg on March 16, 1838, was promoted to the rank of reefer in January 1840. In 1840-1841 he sailed in the Baltic Sea on frigates Alexander Nevsky and Kastor. January 1, 1841 promoted to the rank of midshipman. In 1842-1846 served on various ships in the Baltic Sea, and in early 1847 was transferred into the Black Sea Fleet. 

In 1847-1848 he participated in landing operations near Abkhazia, April 11, 1848 was promoted to the rank of lieutenant for military actions against the mountaineers during Caucasian War. In 1849-1850 served on brig "Theseus", sailed from Odessa to Constantinople and further to Aegean Sea. After return to Black Sea, in 1851-1852 served on battleship Tri Sviatitelia and on brig "Andromache".

During Crimean War, Maksutov served as flag-officer by rear-admiral Fyodor Mikhailovich Novosilsky and participated in the Battle of Sinop on board the battleship Paris. For 349 days of the siege of Sevastopol (1854) he was awarded with an Order of St. Vladimir of 4th degree with ribbon, he was also promoted to the rank of captain-lieutenant and after the end of war received two Orders of St. Anna of 2nd and 3rd degrees. 

1863-1876, Pavel Maksutov served as governor of Berdyansk and commander of the Berdyansk seaport. In April 1878 promoted to the rank of mayor-general of the fleet (as of January 22, 1879 renamed "rear-admiral") and served as Governor of Taganrog in 1876–1882, where he became infamous after being implicated in the so-called Valliano Affair. This worsened his state of health and precipitated his death. He died on May 2, 1882 in Taganrog and was buried in Sevastopol.

Honours and awards
 Order of St. Vladimir, 4th class (1853)
 Order of St. Anne, 3rd class (1854), 2nd class (1855)
 Gold Sword for Bravery (1855)

See also
 Dmitri Petrovich Maksutov

External links and references
 Valliano Affair 
 Prince Maksutov in Berdyansk 
 Нахимов П. С. Документы и материалы. М., 1954
 Скрицкий Н. В. Русские адмиралы — герои Синопа. М., 2006
 Списки титулованным родам и лицам Российской империи. Издание Департамента герольдии Правительствующего сената. СПб., 1892
 Список лицам, Главный морской штаб Его Императорского Величества составляющим, на 1866 год. СПб., 1866

1825 births
1882 deaths
People from Penza
People from Penzensky Uyezd
Russian nobility
Governors of Taganrog
Imperial Russian Navy admirals
Russian military personnel of the Crimean War
Recipients of the Order of St. Vladimir, 4th class
Recipients of the Order of St. Anna, 2nd class
Recipients of the Gold Sword for Bravery
Naval Cadet Corps alumni